Pueblo is a town, and surrounding municipality of the same name, in the Mexican state of Yucatán.

At the census of 2010, the town had a population of 4,080 people.

Chicxulub is most famous for being near the geographic center of the Chicxulub crater, an impact crater discovered by geologists on the Yucatán Peninsula and extending into the ocean. It was created by the impact some 66 million years ago of the Chicxulub impactor, an asteroid or comet which caused the Cretaceous–Paleogene extinction event, which led to the extinction of all non-avian dinosaurs. The coastal village (or puerto) of Chicxulub, in the neighboring municipality of Progreso, lies almost exactly on the geographic center of the crater.

The name  is from the Yucatec Maya language meaning 'the devil's flea'.

References

External links
 Link to tables of population data from Census of 2005 INEGI: Instituto Nacional de Estadística, Geografía e Informática
 Google Maps
 Google Earth seashore view at Chicxulub

Populated places in Yucatán